Ri Hak-son (born 12 August 1969) is a North Korean wrestler and Olympic champion in Freestyle wrestling.

Olympics
Ri competed at the 1992 Summer Olympics in Barcelona where he received a gold medal in Freestyle wrestling, the flyweight class.

References

External links

1969 births
Living people
Olympic wrestlers of North Korea
Wrestlers at the 1992 Summer Olympics
North Korean male sport wrestlers
Olympic gold medalists for North Korea
Olympic medalists in wrestling
Medalists at the 1992 Summer Olympics
20th-century North Korean people